Kelvin Holdsworth (born 21 October 1966) is a British priest of the Scottish Episcopal Church. Since 2006, he has served as Rector and Provost of the St Mary's Cathedral, Glasgow.

Early life and education
Holdsworth was born on 21 October 1966 in Leeds, Yorkshire, England. He was educated at Bearsden Academy in Bearsden, Glasgow, Scotland, and Ossett School in Ossett, Yorkshire, England. He studied computing science and mathematics at Manchester Polytechnic, and graduated with a Bachelor of Science (BSc) degree in 1989. He then studied practical theology and Christian ethics at the University of St Andrews, graduating with a Bachelor of Divinity (BD) in 1992.

From 1992 to 1995, Holdsworth was a layman working with St Benet's Chaplaincy, the inter-denominational Christian chaplaincy of  Queen Mary and Westfield College, University of London. In 1995, he entered the Theological Institute of the Scottish Episcopal Church to train for ordination. During this time, he also studied at New College, Edinburgh, and graduated from the University of Edinburgh with a Master of Theology (MTh) degree in 1996.

Ordained ministry
Holdsworth was ordained in the Scottish Episcopal Church as a deacon on 4 July 1997 St Ninian's Cathedral, Perth. He was ordained as a priest on 9 June 1998. From 1997 to 2000, he served his curacy as the precentor of St Ninian's Cathedral.

From 2000 to 2006, Holdsworth was Rector of St Saviour's Church, Bridge of Allan, Stirling, in the Diocese of St Andrews, Dunkeld and Dunblane. During this time, he was also the Episcopal chaplain to the University of Stirling.

His appointment to St Mary's Cathedral, Glasgow was announced simultaneously there and at St Saviour's Church on Bridge of Allan on 5 February 2006. He was instituted at St Mary's Cathedral on 31 May 2006, the Feast of the Visitation.

Controversy

Quran readings of Ephipany 2017
The BBC reported that during the Epiphany service in January 2017, the Quran was read from the lectern, including "the Islamic teaching that Jesus is not the son of God and should not be worshipped."  Holdsworth declined to comment on whether he knew in advance of the reading.   David Chillingworth, primus of the Scottish Episcopal Church, commented, "The decisions which have led to the situation in St Mary's Cathedral are a matter for the provost and the cathedral community," according also to the BBC.  The provost of the cathedral is Holdsworth.

Comments about Prince George

In December 2017, Holdsworth became a figure of international attention in a controversy over comments he made about Prince George. Holdsworth stated of the then four-year-old child that Anglicans should pray that he, "be blessed one day with the love of a fine young gentleman", to force the Anglican Communion to institutionalize same-sex marriage. According to TIME magazine, Holdsworth's comments about the child's sexuality "sparked outrage." Holdsworth was strongly criticised by Gavin Ashenden, former Honorary Chaplain to the Queen, who stated the comment was "unkind" and "profoundly un-Christian" and added this was the "theological equivalent of the curse of the wicked fairy in one of the fairytales".

Holdsworth replied that the controversial blog post in question was two years old, and "was entirely about the church and its policies around LGBT inclusion" and not about the Royal family. However, he did offer an apology, stating:

Political career
Holdsworth stood for the Bridge of Allan ward of Stirling Council in May 2003.

Holdsworth stood for the Parliament of the United Kingdom in the constituency of Stirling at the 2005 General Election as the Liberal Democrat candidate. He came third behind the Labour and Conservative Party candidates.

Personal life
Holdsworth is openly gay. He was listed at number 35 of the most influential LGBT people in the UK in 2015

References

External links

 

Scottish Episcopalian clergy
Living people
Alumni of Manchester Metropolitan University
1966 births
Provosts of St Mary's Cathedral, Glasgow
People educated at Bearsden Academy
Alumni of the University of Edinburgh
Alumni of the University of St Andrews
LGBT Anglican clergy
Clergy from Leeds
Scottish LGBT politicians
Liberal Democrats (UK) politicians